Tin Yan Estate is a public housing estate in Tin Shui Wai, New Territories, Hong Kong, near Light Rail Chung Fu and Tin Fu stops. It consists of eight residential buildings completed in 2002 and 2004 respectively. Four of them were originally designed as an Interim Housing estate, but they were renovated to become a public housing estate in 2004. During the SARS outbreak in 2003, Block 2 and 3 were furnished as temporary quarters for frontline healthcare staff.

Houses

Demographics
According to the 2016 by-census, Tin Yan Estate had a population of 10,889. The median age was 47.1 and the majority of residents (98 per cent) were of Chinese ethnicity. The average household size was 2 people. The median monthly household income of all households (i.e. including both economically active and inactive households) was HK$15,000.

Politics
For the 2019 District Council election, the estate fell within two constituencies. Most of the estate is located in the Yuet Yan constituency, which was formerly represented by Hong Chin-wah until July 2021, while the remainder of the estate falls within the Fu Yan constituency, which was formerly represented by Kwan Chun-sang until July 2021.

See also

Public housing estates in Tin Shui Wai

References

Tin Shui Wai
Public housing estates in Hong Kong
Residential buildings completed in 2002
Residential buildings completed in 2004
2002 establishments in Hong Kong